Presidential elections were held in El Salvador in January 1876. Andrés del Valle ran unopposed and was elected by the legislature.

Results

References

El Salvador
1870s in El Salvador
Election and referendum articles with incomplete results
Presidential elections in El Salvador
Single-candidate elections